Miecław's Rebellion was a military conflict fought from , between the Duchy of Poland led by Casimir I the Restorer and its ally, Kievan Rus' led by Yaroslav the Wise, against forces of Miecław, the self-proclaimed leader of his state, and allied with him the Duchy of Pomerelia and Yotvingians. The war had ended in 1047 with the state being reconquered by Poland and the death of its leader, Miecław.

Background 
Following the death of Mieszko II Lambert, king of Poland, in 1034, and the exile of his son, Casimir I the Restorer, to Kingdom of Hungary, the state had fallen into a period of destabilization within the Duchy of Poland, that led to the start of the 1038 Peasant Uprising. Seizing the opportunity, around 1038, the cup-bearer Miecław had formed the state in Masovia, declaring its independence from Poland, and started his own royal dynasty.

1041 campaign 
Casimir I the Restorer, duke of Poland, had returned to the country from his exile in 1039. He had formed an alliance with Yaroslav the Wise, Grand Prince of Kiev, the leader of Kievan Rus', via the marriage of Maria Dobroniega with Casimir. Expecting the attack from Rus', Miecław had formed an alliance with the Duchy of Pomerelia and Yotvingians. In the spring of 1041, he had begun the campaign against Polish forces. Miecław's forces had fought with the army led by Casimir and Yaroslav, in the battle of Pobiedziska. The battle ended with a decisive Polish victory and destruction of Miecław's army and led to the signing of the truce between both sides.

1047 campaign 
The fighting had begun again in 1047, as Casimir I, together with Yaroslav, had organized the attack on Masovia, which lead to the battle of their forces against the forces of Miecław and Pomerelia. The location of the battle remains unknown in modern times, though it was known to the 11th-century historian, Gallus Anonymus, according to whom, it took place near the river, with the bluff edge. According to him, Miecław forces had 30 divisions of cavalry, while Casimir, 3 divisions. It is probable that he did not account for the forces of Yaroslav the Wise, and that both sides, in fact, had a similar number of forces. The battle was probably initiated by Casimir I, who hoped to win before the arrival of the Pomerelian army. The battle itself was fierce, with numerous casualties on Miecław's side. The battle ended with Polish victory, following which, Miecław's state was reincorporated into Poland.

Casimir had almost died in the battle but was saved by a soldier, who later had been rewarded for his actions. According to Gallus Anonymus, Miecław had died in the battle. However, according to Wincenty Kadłubek in his Chronica seu originale regum et principum Poloniae, he had escaped to Prussia, where he was murdered.

Notable battles 
 Battle of Pobiedziska
 Battle of Carimir I with Miecław

Citations

Notes

References

Bibliography 
 Ł. Piernikarczyk, Masław i jego państwo (1037–1047).
 Tadeusz Łepkowski, Słownik historii Polski. Warsaw. 1973, p. 363.
 Kazimierz Odnowiciel, Śląsk, 1979.
 A. Bielowski, Kronika śląsko-polska, in Monumenta Poloniae Historica, vol. 3, Warsaw, 1961.
 Gallus Anonymus, Gesta principum Polonorum, Ossolineum, 2003, ISBN 83-04-04610-5.
 Nestor the Chronicler, Primary Chronicle'', Ossolineum, 2005, ISBN 83-04-04750-0.

11th-century rebellions
Wars of the Middle Ages
Medieval rebellions in Europe
Separatist rebellion-based civil wars
Wars involving Poland
Rebellions in Poland
History of Masovia
History of Poland during the Piast dynasty
1030s conflicts
1040s conflicts
11th century in Europe
11th century in Poland
History of Kievan Rus'